The State Register of Heritage Places is maintained by the Heritage Council of Western Australia. , 206 places are heritage-listed in the Shire of Victoria Plains, of which five are on the State Register of Heritage Places.

List
The Western Australian State Register of Heritage Places, lists the following five state registered places within the Shire of Victoria Plains:

References

Victoria Plains
Victoria Plains
Shire of Victoria Plains